Mohamed Khaled bin Nordin (Jawi: محمد خالد بن نورالدين; born 30 November 1958) is a Malaysian	politician who has served as the Minister of Higher Education for the second term in Pakatan Harapan (PH) administration under Prime Minister Anwar Ibrahim since December 2022 and the Member of Parliament (MP) for Kota Tinggi since November 2022. He served as the 15th Menteri Besar of Johor from May 2013 to May 2018, Deputy Minister of Works, Minister of Entrepreneur and Co-operatives Development and his first term as Minister of Higher Education in the Barisan Nasional (BN) administration under former Prime Ministers Mahathir Mohamad, Abdullah Ahmad Badawi and Najib Razak from 1999 to 2013, MP for Johor Bahru from October 1990 to March 2004 and for Pasir Gudang from March 2004 to May 2013, Member of the Johor State Legislative Assembly (MLA) for Permas from May 2013 to May 2018 and Chairman of Boustead Holdings from 2020 to his resignation in 2021. He is a member of the United Malays National Organisation (UMNO), a component party of the ruling Barisan Nasional (BN) coalition. He has served as the Vice President of UMNO since June 2018 and State Chairman of UMNO of Johor since January 2023.

Early life
Khaled is of Banjar descent. He was born in Muar, Johor, Malaysia. He received his early education at Sekolah Rendah Ledang Tangkak and High School Muar later before continued to English College Johore Bahru. Khaled further his studies at University of Malaya and graduated with a law degree in 1982.

Career
Before entering politics, Khaled worked for the Malaysian oil giant Petronas. In the 1980s he worked as an adviser to Shahrir Abdul Samad, a federal minister.

Politics
Khaled entered the federal parliament himself in the 1990 election, at the age of 31, winning the seat of Johor Bahru against a Parti Melayu Semangat 46 (S46) candidate. In 2004 he became the Minister of Entrepreneur and Co-operatives Development, and in 2008 was appointed as the Minister of Higher Education. After 23 years at federal politics, he shifted to the Johor State Legislative Assembly in the 2013 election, winning the seat of Permas. The Barisan Nasional coalition held its majority in the assembly, and Khaled took over as the state's 15th Menteri Besar of Johor. In the 2018 election somehow, Khaled contested concurrently the Pasir Gudang parliamentary and Permas state seats but was defeated both which also witnessed BN lost in the federal and state governments to Pakatan Harapan (PH). Khaled decided not to contest the 2022 Johor state election which will be for the first time held separately for the federal and state elections.

Election results

Honours

Honours of Malaysia
  :
  Knight Grand Commander of the Order of the Crown of Johor (SPMJ) – Dato' (2013)
  Grand Knight of the Order of Sultan Ibrahim of Johor (SMIJ) – Dato' (2015)
  Gold Medal of the Sultan Ibrahim of Johor Medal (PSI I) (2017)
  :
  Grand Knight of the Order of the Crown of Pahang (SIMP) – formerly Dato', now Dato' Indera (2006)
  :
  Officer of the Order of the Defender of the State (DSPN) – Dato' (2002)
  :
  Knight Grand Commander of the Order of the Perak State Crown (SPMP) – Dato' Seri (2006)
  :
  Knight Commander of the Most Exalted Order of the Star of Sarawak (PNBS) – Dato Sri (2008)

See also
 Johor Bahru (federal constituency)
 Pasir Gudang (federal constituency)

References

 
 
 

1958 births
Living people
People from Muar
People from Johor
Malaysian people of Malay descent
Malaysian people of Banjar descent
Malaysian Muslims
University of Malaya alumni
United Malays National Organisation politicians
Chief Ministers of Johor
Johor state executive councillors
Members of the Johor State Legislative Assembly
Members of the Dewan Rakyat
Education ministers of Malaysia
Knights Grand Commander of the Order of the Crown of Johor
Knights Commander of the Most Exalted Order of the Star of Sarawak